Fintan Burke (born 1997) is an Irish hurler who plays for Galway Senior Championship club St Thomas's and at inter-county level with the Galway senior hurling team. He usually lines out as a full-back.

Honours

St Thomas's
Galway Senior Hurling Championship (5): 2016, 2018, 2019, 2020, 2021

Galway
National Hurling League (1): 2021
All-Ireland Minor Hurling Championship (1): 2015

References

1997 births
Living people
St Thomas's hurlers
Galway inter-county hurlers
Irish electricians